The Communist Party of Iran (CPI) is an Iranian communist party founded on 2 September 1983. It has an armed wing and its membership is predominantly Kurdish. The CPI is active throughout the industrialised areas of Iran.

History 

The Communist Party of Iran was founded in 1983, in Iranian Kurdistan. It was formed from a merger between the Marxist–Leninist Komala Party of Iranian Kurdistan and three related Iranian leftist organizations: Sahand, the Union of Communist Militants, and a faction of Peykar. Prior to the merger, Komala was considered to be a strictly Maoist party. The CPI, however, has been critical of Mao as a revolutionary, considering that he made many mistakes throughout the 1950s to 1970s. The party opposes the government of the Islamic Republic of Iran. The CPI also rejects the policies of the Tudeh Party of Iran from the late 1950s and onward, citing a particular grievance with Tudeh giving support to the Shahs of Iran and Ayatollah Khomeini's regime. CPI has also rejected the USSR and considered it representative of state capitalism and not socialism. CPI emphasises that the Soviet Union was not a socialist government after death of Lenin.

Goals 

The CPI currently advocates for increased civil, political, and social rights in Iran, as well as improved labour laws and protections for workers.

The party has representations in Germany (Köln and Frankfurt), Finland, Sweden (Göteborg and Stockholm), Norway, Denmark (Copenhagen), the United Kingdom (London), Australia, and Canada (Toronto).

Structure 
Unlike most other communist parties, the CPI is not organised on the basis of democratic centralism. The party is decentralised and its cadres generally act autonomously.

See also 
 Communist Party of Iran (Marxist–Leninist–Maoist)

References

External links 
 
 English website of Communist Party of Iran

1984 establishments in Iran
Banned communist parties
Banned political parties in Iran
Communism in Kurdistan
Communist militant groups
Communist parties in Iran
Left-wing militant groups in Iran
Militant opposition to the Islamic Republic of Iran
Political parties established in 1984